Bozzai is a village in Vas County in western Hungary, 10 km east of Szombathely.

External links 
 Street map (Hungarian)

Populated places in Vas County